Verdugo Hills may refer to:

 Verdugo Mountains, California, United States
 Verdugo Hills (album), an album by Caroline Lufkin

See also